Radu Crișan (born 27 April 1996) is a Romanian professional footballer who plays as a defender for CSC 1599 Șelimbăr. Crișan started his career at Universitatea Cluj and played also for teams such as: Astra Giurgiu, Academica Clinceni or Hermannstadt.

Honours
Hermannstadt
Cupa României: Runner-up 2017–18

Astra Giurgiu
Romanian Supercup: 2016

UTA Arad
Liga II: 2019-20

References

External links
 
 

1996 births
Living people
People from Turda
Romanian footballers
Association football defenders
Romania youth international footballers
Liga I players
Liga II players
FC Petrolul Ploiești players
FC Astra Giurgiu players
FC Universitatea Cluj players
ACS Sticla Arieșul Turda players
LPS HD Clinceni players
FC Hermannstadt players
FC Dunărea Călărași players
FC UTA Arad players
FC Rapid București players
CSC 1599 Șelimbăr players